The Terex 33-19 "Titan" was a prototype off-highway, ultra class, rigid frame, three-axle, diesel/AC electric powertrain haul truck designed by the Terex Division of General Motors and assembled at General Motors Diesel Division's London, ON, Canada assembly plant in 1973. Only one 33-19 was ever produced and it was the largest, highest capacity haul truck in the world for 25 years. After 13 years in service, the 33-19 was restored and is now preserved on static display as a tourist attraction in Sparwood, BC, Canada.

Development and production
General Motors developed the Titan in response to the need for more efficient haul trucks by open pit mine operators. GM believed that a general decrease in mineral ore quality combined with a projected need to mine tar shale and tar sands would increase the quantity of ore hauled by surface mine operators' trucks, worldwide. The Titan was the largest in the Terex 33 series of off-road haul trucks, which also included the 33-03, 33-05, 33-07, 33-09, 33-11 and the 33-15. The 33-19 and the 33-15 both used diesel/AC electric powertrains, while the other, smaller members of the 33 series of haul trucks used mechanical powertrains.

The Titan was assembled at the General Motors Diesel Division's assembly plant in London, Ontario, Canada, in 1973. The Titan was first shown to the public in October 1974 at the American Mining Congress in Las Vegas, NV.

GM predicted that when the Titan entered regular production, it would cost approximately US$1.5 million in 1976 (or $ million today). However, the Titan never entered regular production. The worldwide coal market softened in the late 1970s, causing coal mines to decrease production and economize by rebuilding existing equipment or purchasing smaller haul trucks with proven operational records. The projected market for the 33-19 "Titan" never materialized and the prototype was the only unit ever assembled.

Service history
Terex put the Titan into service with Kaiser Steel at its iron mine at Eagle Mountain, California, in January 1975. The Titan experienced frequent downtime, but hauled approximately 3.5 million tons of earth over the course of its four years of service at the Eagle Mountain mine.

In late 1978, the Titan was sent to Kaiser Steel's mine at Sparwood, British Columbia, Canada. The mine was acquired from Kaiser Steel by B.C. Resources in 1980. When the mine was subsequently acquired by Westar Mining in 1983, the Titan was repainted from its original Terex lime green livery to Westar Mining's blue and yellow livery. Shortly after, Westar Mining purchased the Titan from General Motors for US$200,000 ($ today) and $1 million of spare parts ($ million today). During Westar Mining's ownership, the Titan had an uptime rate of more than 70% and regularly hauled loads exceeding . Westar Mining retired the Titan from service in 1991.

Public display

After acquiring the Sparwood Mine in late 1992, Teck Corporation offered the Titan for preservation as a public monument in 1993. The Sparwood, British Columbia Chamber of Commerce completed a fund raising effort, restored the Titan, and promotes it as a tourist attraction. The Titan is on static display off Highway 3 in Titan Park, 126B Aspen Drive, Sparwood, British Columbia, Canada. Although the 33-19 "Titan" was restored, the engine has been removed.

The Titan played a starring role in a 1977 Terex television commercial  alongside golfing great Jack Nicklaus.  The commercial opens with Nicklaus standing in the loaded bed of the Titan, hitting golf balls, and ends with a panorama of Nicklaus standing amidst several of Terex' then-current products.

Specifications
At the time of its construction in 1973, the Titan was the largest, highest payload capacity truck ever built. The Titan remained the highest capacity haul truck in existence for 25 years until the début of the  payload capacity Caterpillar 797 in September 1998.

The Titan utilized a power, all-wheel steering system. The front wheels swept through a 71-degree arc. At a preset point as the front wheels moved off-center, the eight rear wheels would also begin to steer, moving up to a maximum of 10 degrees off center. The Titan required ten 40.00x57 tires.

In popular culture
In Haim Saban's Power Rangers Megaforce, adapted from Saburo Hatte's Goseiger (©2012), Robo Knight, the Megaforce Rangers' silver robotic ally, utilizes the Titan.  After converting to his Lion Zord mode in his giant form, Robo Knight merges with the Titan to become the Lion Mechazord.

See also
 Haul truck

Notes

References

Further reading

External links

Terex 33-19 "Titan" Product Brochure GMD 1946 (PDF) - PDF Cast
Terex 33-19 "Titan" Tourist Information
Titan Cam, Sparwood, BC

Terex vehicles
Haul trucks